Widerøe is a Norwegian regional airline.

Widerøe may also refer to:

People
 Rolf Widerøe (1902–1996), Norwegian accelerator physicist
 Turi Widerøe (born 1937), Norwegian aviator
 Viggo Widerøe (1904–2002), Norwegian aviator and founder of the airline

Other
 Mount Widerøe, Antarctica
 Widerøe Polar, an aircraft